Glorious Path is a 1949 Soviet film directed by Boris Buneev, Anatoli Rybakov and Mikhail Shvejtser.

Plot 
The film tells about a village girl Sasha Voronkova, moving to the city in the hope of realizing her dream: to become a train driver.

Starring 
 Aleksandr Antonov as Ivan Konstantinovich
 Aleksey Bakhar
 Sergey Bondarchuk as Sekretar gorkoma
 Inna Fyodorova 
 Georgi Gumilevsky as Ded i hochnoy storozh
 Olesya Ivanova as Sasha Voronkova
 Viktor Khokhryakov as Ponomaryov
 G. Koryagin 	
 Muza Krepkogorskaya as Katya
 Leonid Kulakov as Samson Ivanovich
 Vasili Makarov as Kapitan
 Nadir Malishevsky as Kolya Makagon
 Grigory Mikhaylov
 Pyotr Savin as Normirovshchik
 Nina Savva 	
 Aleksandr Shirshov as Aleksey
 Zoya Tolbuzina 
 Mikhail Troyanovskiy as Trofimych
 Vladimir Vladislavskiy as Kladovshchik
 Kira Zharkova

References

External links 
 

1949 films
1940s Russian-language films
Soviet drama films
1949 drama films
Soviet black-and-white films
Films directed by Mikhail Shveytser